ŠK Ferraria was a Croatian football club formed in Zagreb. The club was founded in November 1922, as the local ironworkers' club. Throughout its existence the club played a major role in lower-tier local competitions, before it was disbanded in June 1945 by the communist authorities.

The club won 5 titles in the local Zagreb league in their most successful period between 1924 and 1930, under the guidance of former Građanski player and Yugoslav international Rudolf Rupec. In addition, several notable players started their careers at Ferraria or had managing spells at the club, such as Zvonko Monsider, Ivica Horvat, and Bernard Hügl among others.

References

External links
Ferraria at Nogometni leksikon 

Football clubs in Zagreb
Defunct football clubs in Croatia
Association football clubs established in 1922
Association football clubs disestablished in 1945
1922 establishments in Croatia
1945 disestablishments in Croatia